Port City International University or PCIU is a private university located at South Khulshi, Chattogram, Bangladesh.The university was established under the Private University Act 2013. PCIU is regulated by the Bangladesh University Grants Commission (UGC).

History 
The founding president  of PCIU is Mr. AKM Enamul Hoque Shameem, MP, and Chairman is Thamina Khatun and the founding vice-president and vice-chairman is Mr. Zahir Ahammed.

Academics

Faculties and departments 
Academic activities are undertaken by 12 departments under three faculties. Twelve departments offer undergraduate courses.

Faculty of Science and Engineering 
 B.Sc. and M.Sc. in Computer Science & Engineering (CSE)
B.Sc. and M.Sc. in Civil Engineering (CE)
 B.Sc. in Electrical and Electronic Engineering (EEE)
B.Sc. in Textile Engineering (TE)
B.Sc. in Fashion Design and Technology
Department of Natural Science (NSC)
 Course of Mathematics
 Course of Statistics
 Course of Physics
 Course of Chemistry
 Course of History

Faculty of Humanities, Social Sciences & Law 
 B.A. Hons and M.A. in English
Bachelor of Laws (LLB Hons.)
 Masters of Laws (LLM Final)
 Masters of Laws (LLM Preliminary & Final)
B.S.S (Hons.) & M.S.S (Hons.) in Broadcast & Print Journalism

Faculty of Business Studies and Administration 
 Bachelor of Business Administration (BBA)
 Master of Business Administration (MBA)

Department of Economics 
 B.S.S. (Hons.) in Economics
 M.S.S. in Economics (Final)

Library 
Port City International University (PCIU) Library has been developing from the very outset of its launch in 2013.

Students Life

Student organizations 
There are a number of student organizations in the university.
 𝗣𝗖𝗜𝗨 𝗧𝗲𝘅𝘁𝗶𝗹𝗲 𝗖𝗹𝘂𝗯.
 𝗣𝗖𝗜𝗨 𝗦𝗽𝗼𝗿𝘁𝘀 𝗙𝗼𝗿𝘂𝗺.
 𝗣𝗖𝗜𝗨 𝗖𝘂𝗹𝘁𝘂𝗿𝗮𝗹 𝗙𝗼𝗿𝘂𝗺.
 𝗣𝗖𝗜𝗨 𝗩𝗼𝗹𝘂𝗻𝘁𝗲𝗲𝗿.
 𝗣𝗖𝗜𝗨 𝗗𝗲𝗯𝗮𝘁𝗲 𝗙𝗼𝗿𝘂𝗺.
 𝗣𝗖𝗜𝗨 𝗕𝘂𝘀𝗶𝗻𝗲𝘀𝘀 𝗖𝗹𝘂𝗯.
 𝗣𝗖𝗜𝗨 𝗥𝗼𝗯𝗼𝘁𝗶𝗰𝘀 𝗖𝗹𝘂𝗯.

References

 http://www.portcity.edu.bd/HomePage/ListPrimary/8/C/academic-faculty-and-department
 http://www.portcity.edu.bd/HomePage/DepatmentDetails/56/C/ratnagarva-begum-ashrafunnesa-library

External links
 

2013 establishments in Bangladesh
Universities and colleges in Chittagong
Educational institutions established in 2013
Private universities in Bangladesh